Ian Colquhoun  is an author, actor, stuntman and Historian originally from Craigshill in Livingston in Scotland. He lost his legs and was almost killed in an unprovoked assault and arson attack whilst living in the Republic of Ireland in 2002 and now wears prosthetic legs.  He gives lectures to physiotherapy students at an Edinburgh University about his condition.

His autobiography Burnt – Surviving Against All the Odds – Beaten, Burnt and Left for Dead. One Man's Inspiring Story of His Survival After Losing His Legs was published in 2007. His second book, "Drumossie Moor: Jack Cameron, the Irish Regiment and the Battle of Culloden", describes the role of Irish troops during the Jacobite Rising of 1745.

Colquhoun appeared on Channel 4's Richard & Judy in August 2007 promoting his book and talking about his life. In October 2007 he played 'MacHendry' in episode 92 of the long running SMG drama 'Taggart'.  2007 Also saw Colquhoun appear in a highly successful promotional film that helped Scotland be awarded the 2014 Commonwealth games.

Bibliography
His twelve book releases to date are:
 Burnt – Surviving Against All the Odds – Beaten, Burnt and Left for Dead. One Man's Inspiring Story of His Survival After Losing His Legs
 Drummossie Moor- Jack Cameron, the Irish Brigade and the battle of Culloden
 Nine Lives – A Self-Help Book for Amputees
 GarryOwen! – Jack Cameron, The Seventh Cavalry and The Battle of the Little Bighorn
 Over the hills and far away : The ordinary soldier
 Jihad – Battle for The Sudan
 The Real Livingston – A Kaleidoscope
 Le Boudin – The Demons of Camerone
 Edinburgh – On This Day
 Hibernian FC – On This Day (with Bobby Sinnet)
 From Oblivion to Hampden – Hibs Heroes of 1991
 The Hibs are here – Miller to Millennium

References

https://archive.today/20130624170358/http://www.iancolquhoun.org.uk/list-of-books/
http://www.dailyrecord.co.uk/news/local-news/new-book-towns-true-life-2531287

External links
 Official Site
 Profile at "Amputees In Action"

Living people
Scottish male film actors
Scottish writers
People from Livingston, West Lothian
Scottish amputees
Amputee actors
Year of birth missing (living people)